Mohammad Tahir Hussain Khan (19 September 1938 – 2 February 2010), better known as Tahir Hussain, was an Indian film producer, screenwriter, actor and film director known for his works in Hindi cinema.

Personal life
Tahir Hussain was the father of actors Aamir Khan and Faisal Khan. The hit film producer, director, and writer Nasir Hussain was Tahir Hussain's elder brother and mentor. Tahir's son, Aamir Khan, acted in Qayamat Se Qayamat Tak, a film which was produced by his uncle Nasir Hussain and directed by his cousin Mansoor Khan.

Tahir Hussain directed his son, Aamir, for the first (and only) time in his directorial debut Tum Mere Ho in 1990.

Tahir Hussain was related to first education minister Maulana Abul Kalam Azad. On 2 February 2010, he died in Mumbai following a severe heart attack.

Filmography

Producer
 Caravan (1971)
 Anamika (1973)
 Madhosh (1974)
 Zakhmee (1975)
 Janam Janam Na Saath (1977)
 Khoon Ki Pukaar (1978)
 Locket (1986)
 Tum Mere Ho (1990)
 Hum Hain Rahi Pyar Ke (1993)
 Madhosh (1994) (asst. producer)

Actor

 Jab Pyar Kisise Hota Hai (1961)
 Pyar Ka Mausam (1969) as Sardar Ranjit Kumar
 Janam Janam Na Saath (1977)
 Dulha Bikta Hai (1982)....Judge in court

Director
 Tum Mere Ho (1990)

Writer
 Tum Mere Ho (1990)

Crew
 Teesri Manzil (1966) (production executive)

References

External links

1930s births
2010 deaths
Film directors from Mumbai
Film producers from Mumbai
Indian male screenwriters
People from Bandra
Male actors from Mumbai
Male actors in Hindi cinema
Indian male film actors
20th-century Indian businesspeople
Screenwriters from Mumbai
Burials in India